Car Button Cloth is the seventh studio album by the Lemonheads, and the last under their contract with Atlantic Records.  The band, as it were, consisted mostly of Dando himself playing many instruments, including his usual guitars and lead vocals, and Patrick Murphy on drums, along with a series of session musicians and producer Bryce Goggin filling in on other instruments.  Following the recording of the album, Bill Gibson, who had played bass on several tracks, joined the band for the supporting tour along with Dando and Murphy.

Despite receiving lukewarm reviews and not being as commercially successful as the Lemonheads' previous two albums, It's a Shame About Ray and Come On Feel the Lemonheads, Car Button Cloth has gained a minor cult following in recent years. The tracks "It's All True," "If I Could Talk I'd Tell You" (cowritten by Eugene Kelly of the Vaselines), and "The Outdoor Type" were released as singles in the UK. "Purple Parallelogram," a song written by Dando and Oasis's Noel Gallagher, was originally included on promotional copies of Car Button Cloth between "Something's Missing" and "Knoxville Girl," but was reportedly removed at Gallagher's request.  The album would be the last studio release from The Lemonheads for a decade, when they released a long-awaited self-titled follow-up, while in the meantime the group's frontman and sole remaining original member, Evan Dando, issued his first official solo album, 2003's Baby I'm Bored (a live album and EP were released in Australia two years earlier).

Track listing
All songs by Evan Dando except where noted.
 "It's All True" – 2:15
 "If I Could Talk I'd Tell You" (Dando, Eugene Kelly) – 2:50
 "Break Me" – 3:34
 "Hospital" – 2:54
 "The Outdoor Type" (Tom Morgan) – 2:35
 "Losing Your Mind" – 5:36
 "Something's Missing" – 2:47
 "Knoxville Girl" (Traditional; arranged by Dando) – 3:53
 "6ix" – 2:39
 "C'mon Daddy" (Dando, Epic Soundtracks) – 3:32
 "One More Time" – 2:39
 "Tenderfoot" (Morgan, Adam Young) – 2:01
 "Secular Rockulidge" – 5:33

Personnel 
 Evan Dando – guitar, lead vocals, percussion, piano, bass, Moog synthesizer; drums on track 12; design, illustrations
 Bill Gibson – bass, backing vocals, guitar
 Patrick Murphy – drums except track 12
 Bryce Goggin – organ, vocals, moog synthesizer, producer, engineer, mixing
 Rich Gilbert – pedal steel
 Royston Langdon – piano; bass on track 12
 Erich Drew Luening – whistle
 Kenny Lyon – guitar, clapping
 Dina Waxman – bass

 Scott Hull – mastering
 Sue Kapa – assistant engineer, photography
 Paul Marconi – mixing assistant
 Darrin Ehardt – design

Charts

References

External links
 "If I Could Talk I'd Tell You" music video

1996 albums
The Lemonheads albums
Atlantic Records albums